Palazzo Vitturi is a palace in Venice, Italy located in the Castello district, on the north-eastern side of Campo Santa Maria Formosa, of which the palazzo is the oldest building. The palace is mentioned in the works of Sansovino.

History
Palazzo Vitturi is an ancient building: it was built in the second half of the 13th century, and over the centuries it has undergone several renovations that have not compromised its original structure. Today, in a good state of conservation, the building hosts a hotel.

Architecture
The facade of Palazzo Vitturi is of a Venetian-Byzantine style the 14th century and is decorated with Gothic and Moorish motifs. Of special interest are the openings and decorations of the second noble floor: a central quadrifora, flanked by two pairs of monoforas, over which original tiles and paterae are seen. The balustrades were added in later periods (16-17th centuries). There are frescoes inside the main floor.

The mezzanine has a small trifora in the center. The top floor, with its rectangular openings, dates back to the rest of the complex.

References

External links

Houses completed in the 13th century
Malipiero-Trevisan
Byzantine architecture in Venice